Candalides heathi, the rayed blue, is a species of butterfly of the family Lycaenidae. It is found in southern Australia, including South Australia, New South Wales and Victoria.

The wingspan is about 30 mm. Adults are pale brown with a purple sheen. The underside is white with a row of black dots along the wing margins.

The larvae have been recorded feeding on Pimelea species, Eremophila longifolia, Plantago species and Derwentia derwentiana. They are green with dense white hairs and six reddish knobs on their back. The larvae are attended by black ants. Pupation takes place in a brown pupa with a length of about 10 mm which is formed on the host plant or in debris on the ground.

Subspecies
C. h. heathi (coastal central Queensland to Western Australia)
C. h. aerata (Montague, 1914) (Western Australia (Monte Bello Island, Geraldton)
C. h. alpina Waterhouse, 1928 (Mount Kosciusko, Brindabella Range)
C. h. doddi Burns, [1948] (New South Wales (Barrington Tops, Dorrigo))

References

Candalidini
Butterflies described in 1873
Butterflies of Australia